Heal-all is a common name for the plant Prunella vulgaris.

Heal-all may also refer to:

Pedicularis canadensis, or high heal-all
Stachys, a genus of plants in the mint family

See also
Panacea (medicine), a cure-all, or a medicine capable of healing many ailments